The CyaR RNA (formerly known as RyeE RNA) non-coding RNA was identified in a large scale screen of Escherichia coli and was called candidate 14. The exact 5′ and 3′ ends of this RNA are uncertain. This gene lies between yegQ and orgK in E. coli. This small RNA was shown to be bound by the Hfq protein. This RNA has been renamed as CyaR for (cyclic AMP-activated
RNA). It has been shown that the CyaR RNA acts as a repressor of the porin OmpX. It has also been shown that cyaR expression is tightly controlled by the cyclic AMP receptor protein, CRP.

A comparative genomics approach was able to detect and verify the additional targets ptsI, sdhA and yobF.

See also
RydB RNA
RyhB RNA
RyeB RNA

References

External links
 

Non-coding RNA